The 2016 6 Hours of Circuit of the Americas was an endurance sports car racing event held at the Circuit of the Americas, Austin, USA, on 15–17 September 2016, and served as the sixth round of the 2016 FIA World Endurance Championship season. Porsche's Timo Bernhard, Brendon Hartley and Mark Webber won the race driving the No. 1 Porsche 919 Hybrid car.

Qualifying

Qualifying result
Pole position in Class is in bold.

 – Only one driver of the No. 26 G-Drive Racing set a lap time.

Race

Race result
Class winners are denoted with bold.

Notes

References

6 Hours of Circuit of the Americas
Circuit of the Americas
Lone Star Le Mans
6 Hours of Circuit of the Americas
Sports in Austin, Texas
Motorsport competitions in Texas
2016 in sports in Texas